The Great Deflation or the Great Sag refers to the period from 1870 until 1890 in which the world prices of goods, materials and labor decreased, although at a low rate of less than 2% annually. This was one of the few sustained periods of deflationary growth in the history of the United States. 
This had a positive effect on the economy in general, as the purchasing power improved.

Many businesses suffered, such as warehousing, especially in the London area, due to improvements in transportation, like efficient steam shipping and the opening of the Suez Canal, and also because of the international telegraph network. Displaced workers found new employment in the expanding economy as real incomes grew.

By contrast to the mild deflation of the so-called Great Deflation, the deflation of the 1930s Great Depression was so severe that deflation today is associated with depressions, although economic data are not quite as clear on the matter.

Productivity caused deflation
The Great Deflation occurred at the beginning of the period sometimes called the Second Industrial Revolution.  It was characterized by dramatic increases in productivity made possible by the transition from agriculture to industrialization in the leading economies.  The new leading industries were Bessemer and open hearth steel, railroads, the machinery industry, efficient steam shipping and animal powered agricultural mechanization.  The prices of most basic commodities and mass-produced goods fell almost continuously; however, nominal wages remained steady, resulting in a pronounced and prolonged rise in real wages, disposable income and savings  – essentially giving birth to the middle class. Goods produced by craftsmen, as opposed to in factories, did not decrease in price.

Deflation with increasing gold supply
The Great Deflation occurred despite an increase in the world's gold supply, which William Stanley Jevons predicted would result in inflation.

See also
Long Depression
Productivity improving technologies (historical)

References 

1870s economic history
1880s economic history
1890s economic history
Economic history of the United States

de:Große Deflation